Luis Jiménez Cáceres (born 1984) is a Chilean of Aymara descent who was elected as a member of the Chilean Constitutional Convention.

References

External links
 

1984 births
Living people
21st-century Chilean politicians
Members of the Chilean Constitutional Convention
University of Chile alumni